WNYN may refer to:

WNYN-LD, a television station (channel 39) licensed to serve New York, New York, United States
WYKC, a radio station (99.1 FM) licensed to serve Whitefield, New Hampshire, United States, which held the call sign WNYN-FM from 2008 to 2021